Hafun Salt Factory (called initially Saline Dante in Italian) was the biggest salt factory in the world during the 1930s. It was created in the area of Hafun (then called "Dante") by the Italians in northern Italian Somalia. In 1941, it was destroyed during the British conquest of Italian East Africa, in World War II.

History

In 1930, an Italian firm called "Società Saline e Industrie della Somalia settentrionale Migiurtina" ("Saline Companies and Industries of Northern Somalia Migiurtina") invested huge capital to exploit salt deposits in Dante and Hurdiyo. The Hafun Salt Factory was created and was the main producing facility of sea salt in the world in the 1930s. By 1933 or 1934, the Dante salt works were producing more than 200,000 metric tons of salt, most of which was exported to  India and the Far East.

The industrial facility of "Saline Dante" gave work to 600 Italians and 2000 natives (nearly all the native males in Hafun), giving a huge boost to the local Somali economy: Dante city (now called Hafun) grew to more than 5000 inhabitants in 1939. Electrical plants were built in the Dante area for the facility, together with an aqueduct, solving the semi-desert area problems for the first time in its history. The production reached nearly half a million tons per year in the late 1930s and was supposed to increase in the 1940s, but World War II stopped it.

From there, the cable car went to be up to  into the sea extending loading facilities. The cable car and the rope way was built around 1925, by the German company "Ernst Heckel". The British destroyed the salt factory in 1941 during their conquest of Italian Somalia and since then the productivity has been reduced to a minimal activity until the 1950s, when was totally abandoned. The result was that Hafun in the 1970s was reduced to a small village of nearly 500 native inhabitants surviving mainly on fishing.

However, in late 2014, the Udug Limited Company, in conjunction with the United States-based REDD Engineering & Construction Incorporation, began conducting feasibility studies for the renovation of the salt production plants in Hafun and Hurdiyo. The first phase of the initiative was completed in March 2015, and saw the historic salt works in both towns refurbished following community-wide consultations. REDD Engineering official Lowry Redd indicated that the initiative aims to make the plant in the area of Hafun one of the main global suppliers of salt.

See also
Italian Somalia
Italian Somalians
Ras Hafun
Somalia

Notes

External links
Migiurtina salt factory video
Photos of the Hafun/Dante Salt Factory

Italian Somaliland